Pensa (also, Ponsa and Pinsa) is a town in Bam Province, Burkina Faso.

References

Populated places in the Centre-Nord Region